Nagaraja Cholan MA, MLA is a 2013 Tamil-language political satire film directed by Manivannan. A sequel to Amaidhi Padai (1994), it stars Sathyaraj in his 200th film, reprising his role as Nagaraja Cholan from the original, alongside an ensemble cast including Seeman, Manivannan, his son Raghuvannan, Mrudula Murali, Komal Sharma and Varsha Ashwathi. The film, featuring music composed by James Vasanthan, was produced by Ravichandran and K. Suresh under the banner of V House Production and shot in Coimbatore and surrounding areas in one single schedule. Unlike the original, Nagaraja Cholan MA, MLA opened to mixed reviews. It was Manivannan's 50th and last film as a director and actor, as he died a month after the film's release.

Cast

 Sathyaraj as Nagaraja Chozhan & Rajagopal
 Manivannan as Ex-MLA Manimaran, the sidekick and ex-officio owner of Nagaraja's illegal properties
 Seeman as a farmer and farmer rights activist
 Raghuvannan as Gangaikondaan, Nagaraja's son who was later the acting chief minister
 Mrudula Murali as Shenbagavalli, Gangaikondaan's wife
 Komal Sharma as school teacher Kamalini, Seeman's fiancée
 M. S. Bhaskar as Kumbakonam Kootha Perumal MLA, the leader of the party in ruling coalition who merges his party with the ruling party for Nagaraja Chozhan to become CM
 Varsha Ashwathi as Amudha, Nagaraja Chozhan's mistress who was initially Manimaran's mistress
 Sujatha Sivakumar as Kamalini's widow mother and Seeman's sister
 Ansiba Hassan
 “Oorvambu” Laxmi as Journalist
 Vaiyapuri
 K. P. Jagannath
 Krishnamoorthy
 Rajkanth

Soundtrack
The film's soundtrack and score were composed by James Vasanthan.

 "Kannadi Papa" — Pooja
 "Malamele" — Palaniammal, Mahalingam
 "Mamanukku Ennadi" — Nancy, Vasudha, Sarayu
 "Suda Sudathan" — MK Balaji
 "Viraivil Vidiyum" — James Vasanthan

Critical reception
The Times of India gave the film 2.5 stars out of 5 and wrote, "If you are familiar with Nagaraja Cholan as a ruthless politician, who rose from being Ammavasai in Amaidhipadai, this movie will definitely disappoint you...his resurrection after almost 20 years ends up a failed attempt to build on the character...The movie is a pale shadow of the original, except for the few scenes involving Cholan and his trusted aide Manimaran". Baradwaj Rangan wrote, "The film seems to be some sort of science fiction, unfolding in a parallel dimension even as the events in Amaidhipadai were taking place. But this isn't the real problem with Nagaraja Cholan MA, MLA. If Manivannan wants to take a hit character from a hit film and spin a new story around him, that's his prerogative — except that the story, this time, doesn't stick".

References

External links
 

2013 films
Indian political films
2010s Tamil-language films
Indian sequel films
Indian political satire films
Films scored by James Vasanthan
Films directed by Manivannan
2010s political satire films